Akira Yuki is a fictional character in the Virtua Fighter fighting game franchise by Sega. As the series' mascot, Akira appears in every Virtua Fighter game as a playable character, and is usually shown on the games' box arts. His fighting style is Bajiquan. Akira strives for perfection and will drive himself relentlessly to master his techniques. He seeks worthy opponents to fight in order to find flaws in his skills to further attain mastery.

Beyond Virtua Fighter, Akira appears as a guest character in Dead or Alive 5 and is featured in the crossover fighting game Dengeki Bunko: Fighting Climax. He's also a selectable racer in Sonic & Sega All-Stars Racing, where he and Jacky Bryant share the same kart.

Concept and creation
Despite being the mascot of Virtua Fighter, Akira was actually the final addition to the game prior to release, being added late into development. Co-creator Yu Suzuki's growing interest in Bajiquan lead to the creation of the character. The addition of Akira replaced Siba, an Arab character originally intended for the game, but was cut out. Early into Akira's creation, he bore more of a resemblance to Kazuya Mishima from the Tekken series, creating the speculation that Kazuya's design was based on him.

Because Akira is a Japanese man whose primary outfit consists of a white karate gi, he was also compared to that of Ryu from the Street Fighter series, while Jacky Bryant, who has blonde hair, and originally sported a red gi, was compared to Ken, friend and rival of Ryu.

Appearances

Virtua Fighter games
Akira Yuki is the grandson of one of the men from the Japanese army who fought in World War II. Akira is known to be hot-blooded and impulsive, and went on a quest to test his abilities after being trained by his grandfather, eventually joining the 1st World Fighting Tournament.

In the 2nd World Fighting Tournament, Akira sets to fix the mistakes he made last time, and won the tournament. As he celebrates his victory, his grandfather told him "Don't flatter yourself. You haven't mastered anything yet." This inspires Akira to enter the 3rd World Fighting Tournament.

This time, he does not win the tournament, but after encouragement from his grandfather, he decides to continue training. During the training, Akira receives an invitation to the 4th World Fighting Tournament, which he enters to test out the new skills he had learned.

Akira loses to Kage-Maru; because of this loss, Akira trains harder than ever before. One day, he caught sight of a leaf floating downstream, and held his breath while it spun around the nearby boulder. Avoiding it, and continuing on in the flow, Akira came to understand that he had been resisting the flow, and resumes his training with this newfound confidence. He decides to enter the 5th World Tournament as a result.

Akira also appears in the spin-offs Virtua Fighter Animation, Virtua Fighter Kids and Virtua Quest.

Other games, crossovers and media
Akira appears in several games outside the Virtua Fighter universe, including Fighters Megamix, Sonic & Sega All-Stars Racing, Dead or Alive 5, Project X Zone, Project X Zone 2, Dengeki Bunko: Fighting Climax, and Super Smash Bros. Ultimate. The former five games feature him as a playable character, while Smash Ultimate features him as an Assist Trophy, and as a Mii costume. The child version of Akira from Virtua Fighter Kids also appears in Fighters Megamix.

On December 8, 2021 a skin of Kazuma Kiryu from the action-adventure series Yakuza was released for Akira in Virtua Fighter 5 Ultimate Showdown as downloadable content. Akira also received a skin for Kazuya Mishima from fellow fighting game series Tekken in VF5US, which was released as DLC on June 1, 2022.

Akira appears in the anime  of the same name as the franchise, where he serves as the protagonist. Unlike the games, this version of Akira tends to overeat and slack off. But he goes on a quest to seek the eight stars of heaven, after being overconfident with his Bajiquan skills. During the series, Akira and Pai Chan develop feelings for each other.

Promotion and merchandise
In 2016, an action figure of Akira was released by Max Factory. This release was based on the literal appearance of his character model from earlier Virtua Fighter games which has a low polygon count. Another action figure of Akira is scheduled to be released in September 2022, based on his Virtua Fighter 5 Ultimate Showdown design.

Reception
Davi Nonato Braid at TheGamer ranked Akira as the very best character in Virtua Fighter 5 Ultimate Showdown, noting "Constantly considered the most powerful character in Virtua Fighter, Akira Yuki is also the hardest one to master." In a 1995 issue of Mean Machines Sega, they considered him a "bit of a turkey" in the original Virtua Fighter, but felt he was the best character in Virtua Fighter 2. Thomas Bowen of Game Rant listed him as the third-best martial artist in video games.

Akira's inclusion in Dead or Alive 5 was met with positive reception. The Escapist observed "The inclusion of Akira in DOA5 is the best fighting game fan service mash-up I’ve seen since Capcom vs SNK. Akira looks perfectly suited to the action in this game, and the slightly “floaty” nature of the DOA series’ physics are even somewhat reminiscent of early Virtua Fighter titles." Toshi Nakamura from Kotaku observed that his appearance in DOA 5 "held a great deal of meaning not just in terms of homage." Elton Jones of One37pm listed Akira and the other Virtua Fighter guests in Dead or Alive 5 as among the 40 best guest characters in fighting games.

In the same article, Akira's appearance in Dengeki Bunko: Fighting Climax was also mentioned as one of the best guests in fighting games. In another article by Jones of One37pm listed him as a guest character he wanted to see in Tekken 7, partly due to the fact that Akira did not return for Dead or Alive 6; Jones added "We may never get a full-fledged Tekken vs. Virtua Fighter game, but the arrival of Akira in Tekken 7 is the closest we'll ever get to that far-off dream." Ash Gates, writing for Cultured Vultures, likewise listed Akira as a DLC character they wanted to see for Tekken 7, opining "Whilst he might not have the same juggle combo capabilities of the Tekken crew, he'd make an interesting defensive alternative."

Response to Akira's characterization in the Virtua Fighter anime series was mixed. HardcoreGaming101 criticized his goofy traits, his accidental perverted actions and the motto he repeats in every episode before he fights a rival. Ex was more positive, citing how his hunger as an actual plot point, as well as how Akira is searching to be worthy of seeing the stars rather than causing problems. His love-hate relationship with Pai Chan was noted to be entertaining nevertheless. Asian Stuff was more positive, finding Akira likable despite finding his gags too repeated. Despite finding his journey ridiculous, UK Anime Network felt that Akira turns into a fitting hero in the anime series for most of his actions. While comparing him with Ryu from Street Fighter, Anime News Network praised the performance of English voice actor Tony Schnur for fitting Akira's personality.

References

Fictional Japanese people in video games
Fictional martial artists in video games
Fictional martial arts trainers
Fictional wushu practitioners
Male characters in anime and manga
Male characters in video games
Video game characters introduced in 1993
Video game mascots
Virtua Fighter characters
Martial artist characters in anime and manga